André Luís Leite  (born February 19, 1986), or simply André Luís, is a Brazilian striker who currently plays for MH Nakhon Si City in Thai League 3.

Career
André Luís has played for several Brazilian clubs, mainly on loan from either Cruzeiro, who owned his rights from 2003 as a youth until 2010, or from Boavista-RJ between 2010 and 2016, although he never represented either of these clubs in the Brazilian National League system.

He first became notable in 2006 when he scored for Ipatinga in a Copa do Brasil quarter-final match against Santos, which Ipatinga would go on to win.

In 2008, whilst on loan to Caxias, he was re-loaned to Grêmio for the Campeonato Brasileiro Série A season. He played in 14 Série A games and scored his first goal in the game against Vitória on 23 November 2008.

In 2012 he was loaned to Ponte Preta, and made 20 appearances in Série A.

He has also been loaned to América-RN, Duque de Caxias and Atlético Goianiense to play in Campeonato Brasileiro Série B and to CRB to play in Campeonato Brasileiro Série C.

From 2015 to 2017 he spent three seasons in Thailand with Suphanburi, Royal Thai Navy and Chonburi in Thai League 1, initially on loan from Boavista-RJ, but then on permanent contracts when released by the Brazilian club.

In 2018 he returned to Brazil, initially representing Mirassol in Campeonato Paulista, but then re-signed for a second spell with Atlético Goianiense.

Honours 
Vitória
Campeonato Baiano: 2009

Boavista
Taça Rio: 2014

Atlético Goianiense
Campeonato Goiano: 2019

 Lamphun Warrior
 Thai League 3 (1): 2020–2021

References

External links 

Thaileague Official Website: MH Nakhon Si City F.C. Players

1986 births
Living people
Brazilian footballers
Cruzeiro Esporte Clube players
Ipatinga Futebol Clube players
América Futebol Clube (MG) players
Sociedade Esportiva e Recreativa Caxias do Sul players
Grêmio Foot-Ball Porto Alegrense players
Esporte Clube Vitória players
Duque de Caxias Futebol Clube players
Clube de Regatas Brasil players
Associação Atlética Ponte Preta players
Mirassol Futebol Clube players
Atlético Clube Goianiense players
Suphanburi F.C. players
Royal Thai Navy F.C. players
Chonburi F.C. players
Expatriate footballers in Thailand
Brazilian expatriate sportspeople in Thailand
Thai League 1 players
Campeonato Brasileiro Série A players
Campeonato Brasileiro Série B players
Campeonato Brasileiro Série C players
Association football forwards
People from Jaú